Elibia dolichus is a moth of the family Sphingidae first described by John O. Westwood in 1847. It is found in Nepal, north-eastern India, Bangladesh, Thailand, southern China, Malaysia (Peninsular, Sarawak, Sabah), Indonesia (Sumatra, Kalimantan, Java) to the Philippines (Palawan Island).

Description 
The wingspan is 120–146 mm.

Biology 
The larvae feed on Saurauia, Leea, Cayratia and Tetrastigma species.

References

External links
 

Macroglossini
Moths described in 1847
Moths of Asia